The 2019 International Friendship Championship was a football tournament for the national teams of Iraq, Syria and Jordan. It was scheduled to take place during the March 2019 window of the FIFA International Match Calendar.

Results

References

International Friendship Championship
International Friendship Championship
International association football competitions hosted by Iraq
Sport in Basra